The Four Avenues are a group of four major arterial boulevards — Bealey Avenue, Fitzgerald Avenue, Moorhouse Avenue, and either Rolleston Ave or Deans Avenue — that surround the city centre of Christchurch, New Zealand. Serving as an inner ring road, they popularly form the limits of the city centre, separating it from the city's suburbs. Almost all of the city's commercial heart lies within the approximately rectangular  area formed by the four avenues. The term "within the Four Avenues" is widely used in Christchurch to refer to the central city. By extension, Christchurch as a whole is sometimes referred to as "The Four Avenues".

Historically, Rolleston Avenue, rather than Deans Avenue, was regarded as the fourth of the four avenues, but reconstruction of Christchurch City Centre following the 2011 Christchurch earthquake has officially made Deans Avenue a boundary of the CBD. This has enlarged the central area to include Hagley Park, a green area which dominates the western end of the city's centre. Technically, this means there are five, not four, avenues, as Deans Avenue does not connect directly with Bealey Avenue, the two being connected by the shorter Harper Avenue, which skirts the northern edge of Hagley Park.

The avenues were named for early Christchurch city founding fathers (Samuel Bealey, John and William Deans, James FitzGerald, William Sefton Moorhouse, and William Rolleston), with the exception of Harper Avenue (formerly Park Road) which was renamed in 1931 to honour retiring Christchurch Domains Board chairman Sir George Harper.

Geography
Deans Avenue forms the western edge of the Four Avenues, separating Hagley Park from the major inner suburb of Riccarton. This road runs approximately east-northeast for  before connecting with the western end of Bealey Avenue.

This wide, leafy dual carriageway skirts the edges of the suburbs of Merivale and Edgeware. At approximately its halfway point it is crossed by Christchurch's main street, Colombo Street. Bealey Avenue before reaching its end at a junction with the northern end of Fitzgerald Avenue.

After initially curving slightly to follow the banks of the Avon River / Ōtākaro, Fitzgerald Avenue leads due south, crossing the suburban ends of major inner Christchurch Streets such as Gloucester Street and Hereford Street. To the avenues east lies the suburb of Linwood. After  the avenue ends at a junction with Moorhouse Avenue.

It too is crossed by Colombo Street. The most urban of the four avenues, this dual carriageway lacks the tree-lined nature of the other avenues as it passes between the city centre and light industrial and commercial areas such as Sydenham and Addington.

Major routes crossing the four avenues, other than the inner Christchurch streets already mentioned, include (clockwise from the southern end of Deans Avenue): 
Riccarton Road, which leads through the satellite commercial hub of Riccarton and connects with main routes south out of the city;
Riccarton Avenue, which traverses Hagley Park to connect with the city centre;
Fendalton Road, leading northwest from Harper Avenue to link with Memorial Avenue, which leads to Christchurch International Airport;
Papanui Road, leading northwest from Bealey Avenue, and linking with routes north out of the city;
Ferry Road, which leads east-southeast to link with Christchurch's coastal suburbs and with the Lyttelton Road Tunnel.

Major intersections
Clockwise from the south-west:

References

Geography of Christchurch
Streets in Christchurch
Christchurch Central City